Invicta is an American watch designer and manufacturer headquartered in Hollywood, Florida. Invicta began as a Swiss watch company in 1837  founded by Raphael Picard in La Chaux-de-Fonds, Switzerland.

History 
In the early 1980s, Invicta went bankrupt and was sold in 1983 to Ondix S.A, which continued producing Invicta watches in Switzerland. Ondix folded due to disappointing sales, and Invicta was re-established in 1991 when acquired by American owners.  In April 2016, Invicta acquired Swiss watch manufacturer Glycine, with Invicta CEO promising to respect Glycine's independence as it supports the Swiss watchmaker financially.

Lineup 
Invicta produces some of its lineup in Switzerland—those models are signed "Swiss Made" on the watch face and specified in the website description for the models.

In November 2012, Invicta announced a line of watches endorsed and designed by hall of Fame NFL player Jason Taylor.

In February 2020, Invicta announced a partnership with Authentic Brands Group (ABG) for Shaquille O'Neal.

References

Companies established in 1837
Watch brands
Watch manufacturing companies of the United States